Honorary Citizen of Europe is an honour bestowed by the European Council of the European Union, for extraordinary work to promote European cooperation. 

It has only been bestowed on three people: 

 Jean Monnet (2 April 1976, during the meeting of the council in Luxembourg)
 Helmut Kohl (11 December 1998, during the meeting of the council in Vienna)
 Jacques Delors (25 June 2015, for "his remarkable contribution to the development of the European project")

References

European Union
Europe
European awards